Stanley Irving Lippmann is a disbarred lawyer, anti-vaccination activist and a perennial candidate from the U.S. state of Washington.

Early life and education
Lippmann was born in Brooklyn, New York and received his undergraduate degree in physics from New York University. In 1995 he moved to Seattle from his then home in California  to attend law school, taking a JD from the University of Washington School of Law in 1998.

Political campaigns
Lippmann has unsuccessfully run for public office more than a dozen times, standing for election for Mayor of Seattle, Seattle City Council, U.S. House of Representatives, Attorney General of Washington, Board Member of the Seattle Monorail Project, King County Executive,  Mayor of Lake Forest Park, Washington, the Washington House of Representatives, and the Washington State Supreme Court.  As Lippmann was disbarred from the practise of law in 2008, a Thurston County judge ruled that he was ineligible to stand for election to this office and ordered his name struck off the ballot, along with that of another disbarred lawyer.

Controversies

Anti-vaccinationism
While in law school, Lippmann wrote a lengthy paper railing against mandatory vaccinations. When running for King County Executive in 2009, he called the 2009 swine flu pandemic a "hoax" intended to "move more Tamiflu off the shelf."

Disbarment
On October 24, 2008, Lippmann was disbarred from the practice of law for numerous financial improprieties including, among others, theft of client funds, charging excessive fees, and improperly taking loans from clients.

Miscellaneous
A disbarred attorney, Lippmann has occasionally made headlines for reasons unrelated to his frequent political campaigns. The month following the September 11 terrorist attacks, Lippmann attended a "flag-waving rally" organized by Seattle conservative talk radio station KVI-AM carrying a sign showing the head of George W. Bush superimposed on the body of Adolf Hitler. According to Lippmann, he wanted to "shock the brainwashed crowd". Despite being protected by eight Seattle police officers, Lippmann was still assaulted by a passerby. In 2004 Lippmann was a partner in a small business center, Lippmann again walked away from a note and left other investors responsible to cover debts totally over $30,000.

See also
 Richard Pope
 Mike the Mover
 Goodspaceguy
 Anti-vaccinationism

References

American anti-vaccination activists
Disbarred American lawyers
Living people
New York University alumni
Year of birth missing (living people)